Elizabeth of Hesse-Kassel (24 March 1596 in Kassel – 16 December 1625 in Güstrow), was a princess of Hesse-Kassel, by marriage Duchess of Mecklenburg, and a poet of the German and Italian language.

Life 
Elizabeth was the eldest daughter of Landgrave Maurice of Hesse-Kassel (1572-1632) from his marriage to Agnes (1578-1602), a daughter Count John George of Solms-Laubach.  Her godmother was Queen Elizabeth I of England, who was represented on this occasion by the Earl of Lincoln.  The christening of the Princess was one of the most elaborate ceremonies at the court in Kassel, including "four days of lavish games, tournaments, and fireworks".  The last knight games in Europe were held on this occasion.  The engraver and historian Wilhelm Dilich made a documentary about the event in 1598-1601.  That volume is now in the City of Kassel Museum. A second manuscript about the celebrations, "compiled and executed by an unknown hand", is held by the Bavarian State Library.

Her father educated her and her brothers at the court school.  Elizabeth was described as very witty.  She was fluent in several languages and has authored more than 200 poems.  She played and composed music and also translated texts into German and Italian,.

Her father wanted to marry her to Charles Philip, Duke of Södermanland, but she refused.  She was then engaged to Frederick Henry, Prince of Orange.  However, he broke off the engagement when he could not meet the considerable demands for her dowry.

Elizabeth married on 25 March 1618 in Kassel, to Duke John Albert II of Mecklenburg-Güstrow, who already had four children from his first marriage.  The Duchess, who was very musical, created the Court Orchestra at Güstrow and was also active as an author.

Elizabeth had no children from her marriage and on her death, her dowry, the city of Dargun, fell back to Hesse.

Ancestors

References

Sources 
 
 Christoph von Rommel: Geschichte von Hessen, vol. 2, Kassel, 1837, p. 349 ff. (Online)

External links 
 https://archive.today/20071020025331/http://www.uni-kassel.de/presse/pm/anlagen/Lautenbuch.htm

1596 births
1625 deaths
Elizabeth
Elizabeth
Elizabeth
17th-century German people
German women poets
Daughters of monarchs